Jacques Acar (14 March 1937 – 21 January 1976), was a Belgian comic book writer and journalist. He is best known as being a pillar of Tintin and Strapontin from 1962 to 1975 working alongside René Goscinny, and was an author “Représentatif de la bande dessinée Franco-Belge classique”.

Biography
At the age of 25, Jacques Acar began his career in professional comics as a writer, writing short stories for Tintin. From 1963, he became a supporting scriptwriter for the house authors: collaborating with :fr:Édouard Aidans (Marc Franval, Tounga and other stories), :fr:William Vance in 1966 (Ringo), and :fr:Paul Cuvelier   (Wapi, Corentin) . In the early 1960s, with :Hugo Fonske, Acar created many comics for :fr:Kuifje (the Flemish version of Tintin), Ons Volkske, Pat and :fr:Het Nieuwsblad.

In the late 1960s, Acar also worked for Line, Record (mainly with Jim Steward on Stanley, Catriona MacKilligan with Claude Auclair, etc.) and Pilote, providing stories for Joseph Loeckx (also known under the pseudonym of Jo-El Azara), Jipo-Max and Géri.

In the early 1970s, he adapted Tounga, Bernard Prince, Bruno Brazil and Les Panthères for Tintin Sélection into novels. Acar has also published science fiction novels, including two at Fleuve Noir, in the “Anticipation” collection, under the pseudonym of Vincent Gallaix.

Published works

Print and Press 
Rataplan, Yves Duval et Jacques Acar (scénario), Berck (dessinateur), 1961-1967 
Nouvelles et divers scénarios de récits courts,  1962-1970
Joly et Mathurin le pirate, avec Hugo, 1963
Bob Binn, avec Édouard Aidans, 1963-1965
Marc Franval : Marc Franval chasse le condor, avec Édouard Aidans, 1963
Céleste Pion, avec Hugo, 1964-1965
Bôjolet, avec Mazel, 1964
Cinq histoires à suivre de Strapontin, avec Berck, 1965-1968
Deux histoires à suivre de Ringo, avec William Vance, 1966
Corentin : Le signe du cobra, avec Paul Cuvelier, 1967
Gomez et Gonzalez : Les Plumes des conquistadors, avec Ramboux, 1975

Other print and press 
Divers scénarios de récits courts dans Pilote, Dargaud, 1965-1966
M. Chapomou, avec Jo-El Azara, dans Pilote, 1965-1966
Poncyffe, avec Van Overloop, dans Pilote, 1965-1966
Picratte, avec Géri, dans Pilote, 1966
Jim Steward, avec Sidney, dans Record, 1970

Albums 
Strapontin (scénario), avec Berck (dessin), Le Lombard, coll. « Jeune Europe » :
5. Révolte au bois dormant, avec René Goscinny (coscénario), 1966
6. Strapontin et le BCZ 2, 1967
7. Strapontin plus un zeste de violence, 1972
8. Strapontin et le rayon alimentaire, 1973
Ringo, avec William Vance, Dargaud / Le Lombard, coll. « Jeune Europe » :
Piste pour Santa Fe, 1967
Le Serment de Gettysburg, 1968
Ces deux volumes ont été repris dans Tout Vance t. 9 : L'intégrale Ringo (deuxième partie), Le Lombard, 2004
Tounga t. 3 : Tounga et le Dieu du feu, avec Édouard Aidans, Le Lombard, coll. « Une Histoire du Journal Tintin », 1968. Rééd. comme tome 7 de l'édition cartonnée, 1978.
Corentin t. 5 : Le Signe du cobra, avec Paul Cuvelier, Le Lombard, 1969
Marc Franval t. 8 : Marc Franval chasse le condor, avec Édouard Aidans, Le Lombard, coll. « Vedette », 1973
Tommy Banco t. 3 : Tir sans sommation, avec Jean Roze (coscénario) et Eddy Paape (dessin), Bédéscope, 1979
Jim Steward, avec Sidney, Hibou, coll. « Traits pour traits », 2006

Science Fiction novels (under the pseudonym Vincent Gallaix) 
Orbite d'attente, Fleuve noir, coll. « Anticipation » no 708, 1975
Zoomby, Fleuve noir, coll. « Anticipation » no 719, 1976

References

Documentation 
Michel Béra, Michel Denni et  Philippe Mellot, BDM 2005-2006, Éditions de l'amateur, 2004.
Patrick Gaumer, « Jacques Acar », dans le Larousse de la BD, Larousse, 2004, 

1937 births
1976 deaths